John or Jack Henry may refer to:
John Henry (folklore), the folklore character and subject of eponymous ballad

People

Politicians
John Henry, Margrave of Moravia (1322–1375), Royal family member of the Holy Roman Empire 
John Henry (Maryland politician) (1750–1798), U.S. senator from and governor of Maryland
John Vernon Henry (1767–1829), American politician, New York State comptroller
John Flournoy Henry (1793–1873), U.S. representative from Kentucky
John Franklin Henry Mississippi state representative 
John Henry (representative) (1800–1882), U.S. representative from Illinois
John Snowdon Henry (1824–1896), British politician from South-East Lancashire
J. L. Henry (John Lane Henry, 1831–1907), Supreme Court of Texas judge
John Henry (Australian politician) (1834–1912), Tasmanian House of Assembly member and treasurer of Tasmania
Prince Johannes Heinrich of Saxe-Coburg and Gotha (1931–2010), Hungarian prince
John Henry (Ontario politician) (born 1960), Canadian politician, mayor of Oshawa, Ontario
John Henry (Cook Islands politician), Cook Islander politician

Sportsmen
John Henry (outfielder/pitcher) (1863–1939), American baseball outfielder/pitcher
John Henry (catcher) (1889–1941), American baseball catcher
Jack Henry (footballer, born 1921) (1921–2004), Australian rules footballer for Essendon
Jack Henry (American football) (fl. 1990s), American football player and coach
John Henry (footballer) (born 1971), Scottish footballer
Jack Henry (footballer, born 1998), Australian rules footballer for Geelong

Other people
John Henry (actor) (1738–1794), Irish and early American actor
John Joseph Henry (1758–1811), American Revolutionary War soldier
John Henry (spy) (c. 1776–1853), British spy
Seán Ó hEinirí (1915–1998), known in English as John Henry, Irish storyteller and last known monolingual speaker of the Irish language
Jack Henry (industrialist) (1917–2003), New Zealand industrialist
Don Marion Davis (1917–2020), American former child actor known as John Henry Jr.
John Henry (judge) (born c.1933), New Zealand jurist 
John Henry (toxicologist) (1939–2007), English toxicologist
John Raymond Henry (1943-2022), American sculptor
John Ruthell Henry (1951–2014), American serial killer
John W. Henry (born 1949), American businessman and owner of sports teams
John B. Henry Jr. (1916-2013), United States Air Force general
John Henry (born c. 1972), American vocalist in the band Darkest Hour
John Henry, a stage name of British comedian Norman Clapham (1879–1934)
Jon Henri, a pseudonym used by American cartoonist Joe Simon

In art, media, and entertainment

Characters
John Henry, a character/ stage name of the comedian Norman Clapham, popular in BBC radio in the 1920s
John Henry, character in the 2006 comic series The Transformers: Evolutions
John Henry, character in the Terminator: The Sarah Connor Chronicles science-fiction TV series
John Henry (DC Comics), alter ego of John Wilson, character in DC Comics
Steel (John Henry Irons), character from DC Comics, more commonly known as the superhero Steel

Film
John Henry, a character in the 1963 film All the Way Home
John Henry (2000 film), a short film in the Disney's American Legends series
John Henry (2020 film), a dramatic thriller film starring Terry Crews and Ludacris

Literature
John Henry (novel), a 1931 novel by Roark Bradford
John Henry, an American Legend (1971), a children's book by Ezra Jack Keats
John Henry (picture book) (1994) a children's picture book by Julius Lester

Music
John Henry (album), a 1994 album by They Might Be Giants
"John Henry" or "John Henry Blues", a song recorded by DeFord Bailey
John Henry (musical), a 1940 Broadway musical based on the 1931 novel

Other uses
John Henry (horse) (1975–2007), American Thoroughbred race horse
Jack Henry & Associates, an American information technology company
John Henry, an American brand of clothing, originated by Henry Grethel, now owned by Perry Ellis International

See also
 
 
 John Hemry
 John Henryism, a psychological term for a type of coping behaviours